Fiadh is a given name for a woman. It is Irish in origin, coming from a word meaning "deer", "wildness" but also "respect".

Origins 
Fiadh was largely unknown as a given name in the twentieth century, although the Irish word was known in the context of the fulacht fiadh and the word for a deer.

Irish given names for children experienced a spike in popularity after Vatican II when societal and parochial pressure to give saint's names to children was eased. Many of the Irish language origin names which were popular in the 1960s and 1970s (such as Sinéad, Deirdre or Emer) were out of fashion by the end of the century after reaching  critical mass. Fiadh was part of a subsequent wave of names that became popular in the post Celtic Tiger period when the Irish language was perceived to have more social cachet.

Popularity 
The name Fiadh first registered on the Republic of Ireland's CSO's name database in 2002, with three incidences noted.  This had multiplied tenfold by 2011 and the name entered the national top ten by 2018. In 2021 it was the first most popular feminine given name in Ireland.

The CSO reported that "Fiadh" was the third highest ranked baby name for girls in 2022 with 320 registrations. A further 79 instances of "Fíadh" were registered. Since 2018, the CSO has a policy of counting accented variations as separate names. When taken together, the total number of registrations for "Fiadh" and "Fíadh" was 399, exceeding the total registrations of the most popular girls name in 2022, Emily, at 349.

References

Irish-language feminine given names
Irish language